Raghubir Singh Bali is an Indian politician and current MLA of Nagrota, Himachal Pradesh.

Son of former Minister  G. S. Balii, Raghubir Singh Bali was selected as the chairman of Himachal Pradesh Tourism.

References 

Himachal Pradesh MLAs 2022–2027
Living people
Indian National Congress politicians from Himachal Pradesh
Year of birth missing (living people)
People from Kangra district